Clifford N. Breitkreuz (born July 30, 1940 near Onoway, Alberta, Canada).  He was raised on a farm and lived there until he left to earn his university degrees (a B.A. from the University of Alberta and a B.Ed. from the University of Lethbridge).  In 1967 he returned to farming, and started teaching at Onoway Junior/Senior High School not long after that.  He taught for 7 years and later was elected as a member of parliament for Yellowhead for two terms (from 1993 to 2000). He was a winning candidate in the 2004 Alberta Senatorial Election and as such was a senator-in-waiting pending a vacant Alberta Senate (and a prime minister willing to honor the non-binding election). Breitkruez term as a senator-in-waiting expired with the 2012 Alberta Senate nominee election in which he did not re-offer as a candidate. He still farms with his wife, Shirley.

References
Cliff Breitkreuz's Web Page

External links
 

1940 births
Living people
Members of the House of Commons of Canada from Alberta
Reform Party of Canada MPs
People from Lac Ste. Anne County
Canadian senators-in-waiting from Alberta